is a Japanese softball player who played third base. Originally from Beijing, China, she was naturalised as a Japanese citizen in 1995. She played in the Japanese teams that won the silver medal at the 2000 Summer Olympics and the bronze medal at the 2004 Summer Olympics, and served as manager of the team that won the gold medal at the 2020 Summer Olympics.

Naturalisation 
Utsugi's original name was Ren Yanli and was born in Beijing. Against her father's wishes, she arrived in Japan in 1988 and played for Hitachi Takasaki, which was managed by Taeko Utsugi. She took her manager's name when she naturalised in 1995, becoming Reika Utsugi. Utsugi could not participate in the 1996 Summer Olympics as a Japanese representative, despite being naturalised in 1995. The regulations in the Olympic charter required China to give her permission to play for Japan, as she had changed her nationality within three years of an Olympic event. China refused, realising the competitive threat that Utsugi posed. Hence, Utsugi's first Olympic appearance for Japan was in the 2000 Summer Olympics.

Retirement 
Since retiring as an athlete she has managed the softball team of Renesas Electronics. She currently manages Bic Camera Takasaki Bee Queen and has managed the Japan women's national softball team since 2011, leading them to two world titles.

References

Chinese emigrants to Japan
Japanese softball players
Softball players at the 2000 Summer Olympics
Olympic softball players of Japan
Olympic silver medalists for Japan
Softball players at the 2004 Summer Olympics
Olympic bronze medalists for Japan
Naturalized citizens of Japan
Living people
1963 births
Sportspeople from Beijing
Olympic medalists in softball
Asian Games medalists in softball
Medalists at the 2004 Summer Olympics
Softball players at the 2002 Asian Games
Softball players at the 1998 Asian Games
Medalists at the 1998 Asian Games
Medalists at the 2002 Asian Games
Asian Games gold medalists for Japan
Asian Games silver medalists for Japan
Oath takers at the Olympic Games
21st-century Japanese women